Daejeon Hanbat Sports Complex is a sports complex, comprising a multi-purpose stadium (including athletic facilities and a soccer pitch), a ballpark, Basketball courts, tennis courts and various other sports facilities in Daejeon, South Korea.

Facilities

Daejeon Hanbat Stadium 

The Daejeon stadium (main stadium) has a capacity of 20,618 and opened in 1964. It was used by Daejeon Citizens before Daejeon World Cup Stadium opened and the team relocated in 2001. It hosted several football preliminaries during the 1988 Summer Olympics in Seoul.

Daejeon Baseball Stadium 
Daejeon Hanbat Baseball Stadium was opened in 1965, and undergone a significant renovation and expansion in 2012. It now has a capacity of 13,500, and serves as home for Hanwha Eagles of Korea Professional Baseball League.

Chungmu Gymnasium 
Chungmu Gymnasium is an indoor sports facility that can be used as basketball, or volleyball stadium. It currently serves as home for Samsung Fire Bluefangs and Daejeon KGC of V-League.

Others 
 Multi-purpose Gymnasium (capacity: 2,000)
 Tennis courts (capacity: 384)
 Auxiliary soccer pitch (capacity: 1,000)
 Auxiliary training facilities
 Gateball court

Name 
Hanbat is the original Korean name of the City of Daejeon. Han means Big and Bat means Field, hence the name of the city where the stadium rests today is a transliteration of the hanja Dae (big) and Jeon (field).

References 

 1988 Summer Olympics official report. Volume 1. Part 1. pp. 206–207.

External links 
  
  
 World Stadiums

Venues of the 1988 Summer Olympics
Olympic football venues
Sports venues in South Korea
Football venues in South Korea
Sports complexes in South Korea
Sport in Daejeon
Buildings and structures in Daejeon
Venues of the 1986 Asian Games